Törmänen is a village in the municipality of Inari along Finnish national road 4, approximately 7 km south of Ivalo. At the end of 2005, 351 people lived in the village.

Road 9691, which leads to Ivalo Airport, branches off national road 4 at Törmänen.

References

Villages in Inari, Finland